Felin-Wnda is a hamlet in the  community of Troedyraur, Ceredigion, Wales, which is 69 miles (111.1 km) from Cardiff and 189 miles (304.1 km) from London. Felin-Wnda is represented in the Senedd by Elin Jones (Plaid Cymru) and is part of the Ceredigion constituency in the House of Commons.

References

See also
List of localities in Wales by population 

Villages in Ceredigion